Samuel P. Rabinovich (1909–1988) was an outstanding Soviet engineer, one of the founders of practical radar systems, the chief designer of the first series of radar stations designed in the 1940s, 1950s and 1960s.

Biography
Samuel P. Rabinovich was born in 1909 in the village of Kamenka, Dnipropetrovsk region. From 1931 to 1937 he studied at the Moscow Institute of Communication Engineers. In the years 1937-1940 participated in creating the first practical radar station (radar) RUS-2 "Redoubt". This station was deployed in the war near the Moscow detected more than 200 German bombers and gave information about them to guide fighters and targeting anti-aircraft artillery.

In 1942, Samuel P. Rabinovich is deputy chief designer of the radar station CPA-2, and since 1945 - chief designer of the radar CPA-4 ("Ray"). For the first time in domestic practice, the station CPA-4 provided three modes: circular scanning, manual antenna control and automatic target tracking the angular coordinates. The first mode is used for target detection and monitoring of the traffic condition on the indicator, the second—for the detection of targets in specific sector before going to the auto maintenance and for coarse positioning, the third—to accurately determine the azimuth and elevation in automatic mode and manual slant range or semi-automatic way.

Since 1956 Samuel P. Rabinovich  is chief designer of the radar sighting of interceptor missiles and command transfer station (RSVPR) experimental missile defense system (NMD). Fully missile defense system first tested in March 1961 had shown the fundamental possibility of defeat warheads of ballistic missiles. This achievement had risen in a row with the launch of the first Sputnik, the first cosmonaut, and other accomplishments, which showed the highest scientific, technical and organizational level of defense enterprises and organizations of the Ministry of Defence.

In the 1970s was the chief designer of the radar ST-68 (5N59) - moving the three coordinates of the station to detect and track low-altitude targets in active and passive noise in the presence of strong reflections from the ground and in adverse weather conditions.

Awards
 Order of the Red Star in 1939
 Stalin Prize (later to rename the State Prize of the USSR) in 1950
 Order of the Red Banner of Labour in 1954
 Order of Honor 1961
 Order of Red Banner of Labor in 1964
 Honored radioman USSR
 Honored Science and Technology of the RSFSR

Biographical Sources
 Scientific-Research Institute of Electro, History Enterprises http://www.niemi.ru/
 Milestones of the 35-year history TSNPO-MAK Vympel
https://archive.today/20130417230008/http://old.vko.ru/article.asp?pr_sign=archive.2005.22.20
 YB Kobzarev, first steps of Soviet radar, Nature Magazine, December 1985, http://vivovoco.rsl.ru/VV/JOURNAL/NATURE/OLD/RADAR.HTM
 By the 90th anniversary of the birth of Grigory Kisun'ko-first General Designer of domestic resources and systems, the Federal Agency for Industry, https://web.archive.org/web/20080213163450/http://www.rosprom.gov.ru/
 Short History of Engineering in, http://pvo.guns.ru/book/vniirt/index.htm
 The first round of Star Wars won SOVIET Union, the Independent Military Review, 2001, http://nvo.ng.ru/history/2001-03-23/5_round.html
 Kisun'ko Grigoriy "Sekrenaya Zone: Confessions of a master designer, Chapter 13, Contemporary, 1996.

External links
 Материал из Википедии — свободной энциклопедии

Radar pioneers
1909 births
1988 deaths
Soviet engineers